Dubrovka is a rural locality (a village) in Nagornoye Rural Settlement, Petushinsky District, Vladimir Oblast, Russia. The population was 20 as of 2010. There are 3 streets.

Geography 
Dubrovka is located 31 km southwest of Petushki (the district's administrative centre) by road. Domashnevo is the nearest rural locality.

References 

Rural localities in Petushinsky District